The Rio de Janeiro gubernatorial election of October 2018 was for the election of the Governor and Vice Governor of Rio de Janeiro and 70 State Deputies. People also voted for 2 of 3 Senators of the state representation in the Federal legislative power, with 45 federal deputies representatives of the Rio de Janeiro State. A second round was held after no candidate managed to secure more than 50% of the Governor votes.

The previous gubernatorial election in the state was held in October 2014. Supported by the Brazilian Democratic Movement, Luiz Fernando Pezão was re-elected in second round with 55.78% of the votes, against 44.22% of Marcelo Crivella.

In the second round runoff, Wilson Witzel was elected Governor of Rio de Janeiro.

Confirmed candidates for Governor

New Party (NOVO)

 Marcelo Trindade - President of the Securities and Exchange Commission of Brazil.

Social Democratic Party (PSD)

Indio da Costa - City Secretary of Urbanism, Infrastructure and Housing of Rio de Janeiro since 2017; Federal Deputy from Rio de Janeiro 2007–2011, 2015–2017; City Councillor of Rio de Janeiro 1997–2006; City Secretary of Administration of Rio de Janeiro 2001–2006. Candidate for Vice President of Brazil in 2010; candidate for Mayor of Rio de Janeiro in 2016.

Social Christian Party (PSC)

 Wilson Witzel - Former federal judge and Marine.

Socialism and Liberty Party (PSOL)

 Tarcísio Motta - City Councillor of Rio de Janeiro since 2017. Candidate for Governor of Rio de Janeiro in 2014.

Democrats (DEM)
 Eduardo Paes - Mayor of Rio de Janeiro 2009–2017; State Secretary of Tourism, Sports and Leisure of Rio de Janeiro 2007–2008; Federal Deputy from Rio de Janeiro 1999–2007; City Councillor of Rio de Janeiro 1997–1999.

Workers' Party (PT)
Marcia Tiburi - Philosophy Professor.

Unified Workers' Socialist Party (PSTU) 

 Dayse Oliveira - Teacher and Militant.

Democratic Labor Party (PDT)

Pedro Fernandes Neto - City Secretary of Social Assistance of Rio de Janeiro since 2017; State Deputy 2007–2017.

Podemos (PODE)

Romário Faria - Senator for Rio de Janeiro since 2015; Federal Deputy 2011–2015.

Republican Progressive Party (PRP)

Anthony Garotinho - Federal Deputy for Rio de Janeiro 2011–2015; Governor of Rio de Janeiro 1999–2002; Mayor of Campos dos Goytacazes 1989–1992, 1997–1998. Candidate for Governor of Rio de Janeiro in 2014.

Brazilian Labour Renewal Party (PRTB) 

 André Monteiro - Policeman from the BOPE and Professor.

Labour Cause's Party (PCO) 

 Luiz Eugênio Honorato - Worker at CSN

Declined candidates for Governor

 Paulo Hartung (MDB) - Governor of Espírito Santo 2003–2011 and since 2015; Senator for Espírito Santo 1999–2002; Mayor of Vitória 1993–1997; Federal Deputy from Espírito Santo 1987–1991; State Deputy of Espírito Santo 1983–1987.
 Marcelo Crivella (PRB) - Mayor of Rio de Janeiro since 2017; Minister of Fishing and Aquaculture 2012–2014; Senator for Rio de Janeiro 2003–2016. Candidate for Governor of Rio de Janeiro in 2006 and 2014.
Sérgio Besserman Vianna - President of IBGE 1999–2003.
Omar Peres (PDT) - businessman. Candidate for Mayor of Juiz de Fora in 2008.
Rodrigo Neves (PDT) - Mayor of Niterói since 2013; State Deputy of Rio de Janeiro 2007–2013; City Councillor of Niterói 1997–2007.
 Cesar Maia (DEM) - City Councillor of Rio de Janeiro since 2013; Mayor of Rio de Janeiro 1993–1997, 2001–2009; Federal Deputy from Rio de Janeiro 1987–1992. Candidate for Senator in 2010 and 2014.
 Bernardo Rezende (NOVO) - Brazil men's national volleyball team coach 2001–2017.
Eduardo Bandeira de Mello - President of Flamengo Rowing Club since 2013.
Celso Amorim (PT) - Minister of Defence 2011–2015; Minister of Foreign Affairs 1993–1995, 2003–2011.
 Miro Teixeira (REDE) - Federal Deputy from Rio de Janeiro since 1987, 1971–1983; Minister of Communications 2003–2004.
Chico Alencar (PSOL) -  Federal Deputy from Rio de Janeiro.
Vinícius Farah (MDB) - Mayor of Três Rios 2009–2017; Vice Mayor of Três Rios 2005–2009.
 Rubem Cesar Fernandes (PPS) - Director of Viva Rio.
Mendelssohn Kieling (PMB) - Prosecutor of justice.
Leonardo Giordano (PCdoB) - City Councillor of Niterói since 2009.

Debates

Governor

First round

Second round

Opinion polls

Governor

First round

Second round

Senator

Senate elections

Confirmed candidates

Results

PSC candidate Wilson Witzel secured 39 percent of the vote in the October 7. His nearest rival, DEM candidate Eduardo Paes, secured 21% of the vote. Both advanced to a second round runoff which was held on October 28. In the runoff, Witzel won the election after securing 59.87% of the vote to Paes' 40.13%

Governor

Senator

Chamber of Deputies

Legislative Assembly

References

October 2018 events in South America
Rio de Janeiro gubernatorial elections
2018 Brazilian gubernatorial elections